The 1934 Connecticut gubernatorial election was held on November 6, 1934. Incumbent Democrat Wilbur Lucius Cross defeated Republican nominee Hugh Meade Alcorn with 46.71% of the vote.

General election

Candidates
Major party candidates
Wilbur Lucius Cross, Democratic
Hugh Meade Alcorn, Republican

Other candidates
Jasper McLevy, Socialist
Alvin M. Gully, Socialist Labor
William E. Hogan, Independent
Isadore Wofsy, Communist

Results

References

1934
Connecticut
Gubernatorial